Alamabad (also Romanized as ‘Alamābād; also known as ‘Elmābād) is a village in Razmavaran Rural District, in the Central District of Rafsanjan County, Kerman Province, Iran. At the 2006 census, its population was 409, in 109 families.

References 

Populated places in Rafsanjan County